Puka Q'asa (Quechua puka red, q'asa mountain pass, "red mountain pass," Hispanicized spelling Pucajasa) is a mountain in the Chunta mountain range in the Andes of Peru, about  high. It is situated in the Huancavelica Region, Huancavelica Province, Nuevo Occoro District. Puka Q'asa lies northeast of Q'iru Pinqullu and Winchu Q'asa, and east of Tipiqucha.

References

Mountains of Huancavelica Region
Mountains of Peru